Journal October is the debut album by cellist David Darling recorded in 1979 and released on the ECM label.

Reception
The Allmusic review by Ron Wynn awarded the album 4 stars stating "Although not strictly a jazz album, David Darling's 1979 solo release, Journal October, deserves attention. His technique is amazing, even if a lot of times he's more interested in colors and textures than in rhythms. He's certainly influenced by contemporary classical music, and at times things get so introspective he almost seems detached. But it's worth investigating, for Darling is capable of exciting statements".

Track listing
All music by David Darling
 "Slow Return" - 12:55   
 "Bells and Gongs" - 1:29   
 "Far Away Lights" - 3:41   
 "Solo Cello" - 5:46   
 "Minor Blue" - 3:23   
 "Clouds" - 6:17   
 "Solo Cello" - 6:26   
 "Solo Cello and Voice" - 2:59   
 "Journal October, Stuttgart" - 10:21  
Recorded at Tonstudio Bauer in Ludwigsburg, West Germany in October 1979

Personnel
David Darling - cello, bells, gong, timpani, voice

References

ECM Records albums
David Darling (musician) albums
Albums produced by Manfred Eicher
1980 albums